"The Wild" is an epithet applied to:

Eadric the Wild, Anglo-Saxon magnate who led the resistance to the Norman Conquest
John V, Count of Hoya (c. 1395–1466)
Cyledr Wyllt, a warrior and madman in Welsh mythology and in the Arthurian tale Culhwch and Olwen

See also
Charles William Frederick, Margrave of Brandenburg-Ansbach (1712-1757), nicknamed the "Wild Margrave"
List of people known as the Mild

Lists of people by epithet